Acrotaeniostola apiventris is a species of tephritid or fruit flies in the genus Acrotaeniostola of the family Tephritidae.

Distribution
India.

References

Tephritinae
Insects described in 1935
Diptera of Asia